is a Japanese television and film director. He began directing commercials and music promotion videos as an employee of Nihon Television. After spending time abroad, he returned and started his own production company, Office Crescendo, from which he works independently. His first television drama on Nihon Television was called Kora! Tonneruzu and ran from 1985 to 1989.
He directed Taitei no Ken, an original work by Baku Yumemakura, in 2007.

Selected films

Kindaichi Case Files (1997) - starring Domoto Tsuyoshi, Tomosaka Rie
Shinsei Toilet no Hanako-san (1998)
Pikanchi (2002)
2LDK (2002)
Jam Films - HIJIKI segment (2002) 
Collage of Our Life (2003)
Forbidden Siren (2006)
Ashita no Kioku (2006)
The Sword of Alexander (2007)
Happily Ever After (Jigyaku no Uta) (2007)
Hōtai Club (2007)
20th Century Boys (2008 - 2009)
BECK (2010)
Eito Ranger (2012)
SPEC: Ten (2012)
SPEC: Close (2013)
Angel Home (2013)
Trick The Movie: Last Stage (2014)
Eight Ranger 2 (2014)
The Mourner (2015)
Initiation Love (2015)
The Big Bee (2015)
Sanada 10 Braves (2016)
The House Where the Mermaid Sleeps (2018)
12 Suicidal Teens (2019)
Hope (2020)
First Love (2021)
Arashi Anniversary Tour 5×20 Film: Record of Memories (2021)

Selected dramas

Kindaichi Case Files (1995, 1996, NTV)
Psychometrer Eiji (1997, NTV)
Keizoku (1999, TBS)
Ikebukuro West Gate Park (2000, TBS)
Trick (2000, TV Asahi)
Stand Up!! (2003, TBS)
Socrates in Love (2004, TBS)
H2 (2005, TBS)
Sushi Ōji! (2007, TV Asahi)
Kosetsu Hyaku Monogatari (2006, WOWOW)
[SPEC: Keishichō Kōanbu Kōan Dai 5-ka Mishō Jiken Tokubetsu Taisaku Gakari Jikenbo (2010, TBS)
Yamegoku: Yakuza Yamete Itadakimasu (2015, TBS)

Awards
 The 40th Hochi Film Award: Best Director for The Big Bee and Initiation Love

Notes

External links
 

1955 births
Living people
Japanese film directors
People from Yokkaichi
People from Nagoya
Japanese television directors
Advertising directors
Hosei University alumni
20th-century Japanese people
21st-century Japanese people